The Tomsk electoral district was a constituency created for the 1917 Russian Constituent Assembly election. The electoral district covered the Tomsk Governorate.

Candidates
3 out of 9 submitted candidate lists were rejected by the electoral authorities, including a moderate Turkic list. The Popular Socialist and Cooperative lists had an electoral pact.

Results
The SR list won a landslide victory, drawing the support from the rural areas. In the Novonikolayevsk uyezd the SRs obtained 95.3% of the votes cast, followed by Kainsk uyezd (91%), Kuznetsk uyezd (90.8%), Mariinsk uyezd (88.6%), Tomsk uyezd (73.6%) and Togur uyezd (64.6%). The Bolsheviks fared better in industrial centers; obtaining some 36% of the vote at the Kemerovo mine and chemical plant, some 32% of the votes were cast at the Anzhersky mines and 25.8% of the votes at the Sudzhensk mines (both in present-day Anzhero-Sudzhensk).

Tomsk town
The election results in Tomsk town illustrated deep social cleavages, as the Kadets, SRs and Bolsheviks each won a major chunk of the votes cast.

Garrison
12,046 votes were cast at the Tomsk garrison. The Bolshevik list won 69% of the votes there, with 8,316 votes. The SR list got 2,683 votes (22.27%), the Kadet list 385 votes (3.20%), Popular Socialist 278 votes (2.31%), 73 votes (0.61%) for the Menshevik list and 10 votes (0.08%) for the Cooperative list.

References

Electoral districts of the Russian Constituent Assembly election, 1917